The list that follows is the Frontbench Team led by Nick Clegg from 2007 to 2010, before the Liberal Democrats and Conservatives formed a coalition government following the 2010 general election, and Clegg became Deputy Prime Minister.

Liberal Democrat Frontbench Team

Clegg Frontbench Team

Other Liberal Democrat Spokespeople

Liberal Democrats House of Lords Frontbench Team
Liberal Democrat peers are also organised into teams broadly corresponding to the areas of Government departments:

2015 General Election Cabinet

See also
Cabinet of the United Kingdom
Official Opposition Shadow Cabinet (UK)

References

External links
Liberal Democrat Frontbench Team
Liberal Democrat Shadow Cabinet
Liberal Democrat Shadow Ministers

Clegg
Politics of the United Kingdom
Nick Clegg
2000s in the United Kingdom
2007 establishments in the United Kingdom
2010 disestablishments in the United Kingdom
British shadow cabinets
2007 in British politics